The men's 110 metres hurdles event at the 2000 World Junior Championships in Athletics was held in Santiago, Chile, at Estadio Nacional Julio Martínez Prádanos on 18, 19 and 20 October.  106.7 cm (3'6) (senior implement) hurdles were used.

Medalists

Results

Final
20 October
Wind: -0.1 m/s

Semifinals
19 October

Semifinal 1
Wind: -1.8 m/s

Semifinal 2
Wind: -0.3 m/s

Heats
18 October

Heat 1
Wind: +0.1 m/s

Heat 2
Wind: +1.8 m/s

Heat 3
Wind: +0.6 m/s

Heat 4
Wind: 0.0 m/s

Heat 5
Wind: -0.1 m/s

Participation
According to an unofficial count, 40 athletes from 31 countries participated in the event.

References

110 metres hurdles
Sprint hurdles at the World Athletics U20 Championships